Racewood is a British company that specialises in creating horse riding simulators. It was established in 1990.

Types of simulators 
To this day, Racewood has made 8 different types of simulators as follows:-

Walking & Trotting: Allows the rider to practice walking and trotting techniques.
Cantering: Allows the rider to practice cantering techniques.
Cantering & Galloping: Allows the rider to practice cantering and galloping techniques.
Riding: Allows the rider to practice walking, trotting, cantering and turning techniques.
Racehorse: Simulates a real life horse race.
Polo: Allows the rider to practice polo shots.
Dressage: Allows the rider to execute all different types of dressage movements.
Jumping: Allows the rider to compete on a show jumping or cross country course.

Format 
Each simulator comprises a black-coloured horse (the Riding simulator is coloured bay, with no legs and real horse mane and tail. They also come equipped with reins with the user only needing to supply his/her own saddle and stirrups.

The simulators are controlled two different ways. The instructor mode is by pressing buttons on the side of the simulators to start, speed up, slow down or stop the horse whilst the rider mode is aid sensitive in the form of squeezing his/her leg on a side sensor panel to start the ride and squeezing again to speed up. To slow down or stop, the rider has to pull the reins.

Some simulators come with equipment for use of a western saddle, a TV screen to simulate the ride and even a coin box operation. They even use a soundtrack to simulate horse sounds during the ride.

Use in popular life 
Racewood simulators can be regularly seen in riding schools and some gyms and tack shops across the UK. They are also sometimes brought in to horse expeditions and shows such as the Grand National, Horse Of The Year Show and the Badminton Horse Trials.

A popular nationwide festival, The National Riding Festival, also uses a Racewood cantering simulator called "Trigger", who appears at every date on the festival tour and at some primary and secondary schools to encourage children to take up horse riding.

External links
 Racewood
 Equitana article
 Saddle Up Cheshire article
 Horse Talk TV article

Equestrian sports
Simulation
1990 establishments in the United Kingdom